The Phoenix Living Poets was a series of slim books of poetry published from 1960 until 1983 by Chatto and Windus Ltd. The poets included in the series offer a cross-section of poets of the era, including some notable writers. Generally those writing were not producing the most experimental work of the era but, taken as a whole, the series covers a significant range of voices and styles.

The series had its origins in the Hogarth Press, which was founded in 1917 by Leonard and Virginia Woolf. In 1946, Hogarth came under the control of Chatto and Windus, and in 1969 Chatto and Windus joined Jonathan Cape, becoming part of Random House in 1987. One of the earliest books in the series was a second impression of Laurie Lee's "The Sun my Monument" originally published by the Hogarth Press in 1944 in its "New Hogarth Library" series and other poets are represented in both series. The Phoenix Living Poets series was started by Chatto & Windus with some continuity of poets from the earlier series and this imprint was maintained throughout the years of publication. Typically the title pages of the Phoenix Living Poets series show both 'Chatto and Windus' and 'The Hogarth Press' together.

The series was edited but the editors are not named on the individual volumes. D J Enright was the editor in the early 1980s (at least), according to J. H. Williams in "The Salt."
Some of the covers were designed by Enid Marx, known for her patterned textile and book jacket designs.
A typical volume has from 48 to 72 pages.

Authors

James Aitchison
Alexander Baird
Alan Bold
R H Bowden
Frederick Broadie
Michael Burn
Philip Callow
Hayden Carruth
Robert Conquest
John Cotton
Jennifer Couroucli
Patric Dickinson  
Tom Earley 
D J Enright
Gloria Evans Davies
Irene Fekete
John Fuller
David Gill
Peter Gruffydd
D J Hall
J C Hall 
Molly Holden
John Horder
Peter Howe 
P J Kavanagh 
Richard Kell 
Laurie Lee 
Laurence Lerner
Christopher Levenson
Edward Lowbury 
Norman MacCaig
Gordon Mackay Brown
Roy McFadden
Diana McLoghlen
James Merrill
Ruth Miller
Leslie Norris
Richard Outram
Robert Pack
Rodney Pybus
Arnold Rattenbury
Adrienne Rich
Hardiman Scott 
Anne Sexton 
Jon Silkin 
John Smith
Jon Stallworthy
Gillian Stoneham
Edward Storey
David Sutton
Terence Tiller
Sydney Tremayne
Jon Manchip White
John Hartley Williams
Lotte Zurndorfer

References

British poetry collections